Mark Barlow (born 16 February 1984) is a former professional rugby league footballer who played in the 2000s and 2010s.

Background
Mark Barlow is the grandson of the rugby league  who played in the 1960s for Wakefield Trinity (Heritage No. 703); Peter Barlow.

Playing career
Barlow announced his retirement from playing after the Keighley Cougar's last match of the 2019 season.  Since March 2019 Barlow has been head coach of amateur side Shaw Cross Sharks.

References

1984 births
Living people
Batley Bulldogs players
Dewsbury Rams players
English rugby league coaches
English rugby league players
Halifax R.L.F.C. players
Hemel Stags players
Keighley Cougars players
Rugby league five-eighths
Rugby league halfbacks
Rugby league hookers
Rugby league players from Yorkshire
Rugby league wingers
Wakefield Trinity players
York City Knights players
Rugby articles needing expert attention